The 2020 Piala Sumbangsih was the 35th edition of the Piala Sumbangsih, an annual football match played between the winners of the previous season's Malaysia Super League and Malaysia Cup. Since both competitions were won by Johor Darul Ta'zim in the previous season, they instead played against the 2019 Malaysia FA Cup winners, Kedah.

Johor Darul Ta'zim won the match 1–0, winning their fifth Piala Sumbangsih title.

Match details

Winners

References 

Piala Sumbangsih seasons
2020 in Malaysian football